Brian Sidney Harper (19 June 1934 – 23 June 2021), known professionally as Brian London, was an English professional boxer who competed from 1955 to 1970. He held the British and Commonwealth heavyweight title from 1958 to 1959, and twice challenged for the world heavyweight title, losing to Floyd Patterson in 1959 and Muhammad Ali in 1966, both times via knockout. He was one of a quartet of British boxers, with Henry Cooper, Joe Erskine, and Dick Richardson, who dominated the British boxing scene throughout the 1950s and 1960s.

An orthodox fighter, London was 6 feet tall and fought at about 14 stone 12 pounds (208 lbs). His nicknames in the ring were "The British Bulldog" and "The Blackpool Rock".

Early life and career
London was born in West Hartlepool, County Durham, on 19 June 1934. He moved to Blackpool when he was 16 years old, where he resided into his later years. His father, Jack London, beat Freddie Mills in 1944 to win the British heavyweight title. He also had a brother, Jack junior, who fought as a light-heavyweight. His father fought under the name "London" rather than Harper, as a homage to an American novelist with this name. Brian never liked the idea of boxing as a child, as he didn't like the idea of having cauliflower ears like his father and his associates. London was spurred to take up boxing during his time in the Royal Air Force for national service, after an officer learned of his familial relations. It wasn't so much of a choice, but rather the expectations of his colleagues. He fought as an amateur before turning professional in 1955.

Professional career
London made a good start to his career, winning his first twelve bouts, one of which was against RAF light heavyweight boxer Brian Wiltshire (UK) in 1951. He finally lost when he came up against Henry Cooper in May 1956. Cooper stopped him with a technical knockout in the first round. Following this defeat, London continued his winning run, apart from two ten-round points defeats, against Heinz Neuhaus in Dortmund, in 1957 and against the talented American Willie Pastrano in February 1958.

British heavyweight title
In June 1958, London fought Joe Erskine, the Welsh boxer, for the British and Commonwealth heavyweight titles. The fight was at the White City Stadium, London, and London took the titles with an eighth-round knockout. He followed this in September with a revenge win against Willie Pastrano, by a technical knockout in the fifth round. On 12 January 1959, London lost his titles in a fight against Henry Cooper, losing for the second time to the Londoner by a points decision after fifteen rounds.

World title fight
In May 1959 he was given the chance of a world title fight against current champion Floyd Patterson, but he lost the bout in Indianapolis by a knockout in the eleventh. He also lost to the Cuban Nino Valdez later that year, by a technical knockout in the seventh. However, in January 1960, London bounced back when he beat the American Pete Rademacher by a knockout in the seventh.

Further domestic career
London challenged Dick Richardson in August 1960 for his European heavyweight title, but lost the bout in Porthcawl, Wales on a technical knockout in the eighth. This result provoked a brawl, when London's father and brother invaded the ring to protest that Richardson had used his head to open a cut on his opponent. When Richardson's trainer shouted a few remarks at London, London replied with an impressive combination of blows, decking him, and chaos broke out. As a result of the incident, London was fined by the British Boxing Board of Control.

London lost to American Eddie Machen in October 1961 by a technical knockout in the tenth, and in April 1963, he lost to Ingemar Johansson of Sweden on points over twelve rounds.

London then fought Henry Cooper for the third time in February 1964, when he challenged for his British and Commonwealth titles, as well as the vacant European title. The fight took place in Manchester, and Cooper won on points after fifteen rounds. His next fight of note was in March 1965, against the young "Golden Boy" of British boxing, Billy Walker. London won on points after ten rounds.

Second world title fight vs. Muhammad Ali

On 6 August 1966 London fought for the World Heavyweight Championship for the second time at the age of 32, when Muhammad Ali came to defend his title at Earl's Court Exhibition Hall in England. Ali at 24 years old with the advantages of height, weight, reach, speed and youth on his side, put on a masterful performance against a clearly out-classed opponent, almost hitting London at will as the fight went on. As London put it in an interview with the BBC: "he was just getting through all the time". Ali bouncingly circled continually, whilst London tracked doggedly after him for the first two rounds seemingly with a strategy of trying to land a single knock-out punch to the American champion. London succeeded in landing only one blow in the match, a left jab to Ali's jaw midway through the first round which caught Ali by surprise and left him for a moment stunned (and wide-open for a follow through right cross, which London failed to take advantage of), but the blow lacked weight and Ali was able to quickly recover. On coming out for the 3rd Round London hesitated to engage. Ali danced him into a corner and threw a rapid 12-punch combination in three seconds, with the tenth knocking London down and ending the fight.

In a post-career media interview, London described Ali as:Big, fast and he could punch, whereas I was smaller, fatter and couldn't punch. He stopped me in three rounds and that was it, I don't think I hit him. It was good money and I got well paid for it – that's all I fought for. Every fight I ever had I always had a go, but with Muhammad Ali I thought "don't get hurt Brian", and I therefore didn't try, which was wrong, totally wrong.

Later career
In March 1967, London next fought American, Jerry Quarry, in Los Angeles, losing the fight by a unanimous decision after ten rounds. In November 1967, London had what was to be the last win in his career when he fought the talented American Zora Folley. Folley had lost a world title fight against Muhammad Ali earlier that year, and London beat him on points over ten rounds.

London had continued to fight when he was past his best, and in June 1968, he lost, by a technical knockout to Jack Bodell. In September 1969 he travelled to Oakland, California, to fight Jerry Quarry for the second time, this time being knocked out in the second round. The bout was unusual in that the bell was inadvertently rung as London was getting up after being knocked down in the second. The fighters returned to their corners and the referee, realising that the round had not finished, made them resume. London was then knocked down again and was counted out before the end of the round.

London's last fight was against the up-and-coming young boxer Joe Bugner, who would eventually take the British, Commonwealth and European titles from Henry Cooper. The bout was in May 1970, at Wembley, and Bugner won by a technical knockout in the fifth, signalling an end to London's career.

Retirement and personal life
After retiring from boxing, London became a businessman in his hometown of Blackpool, owning several nightclubs, and was a fitness fanatic, running 12 miles a day. A teetotaller all of his life, in 2006 it was revealed that London was still only a few pounds over his fighting weight. He was married to Veronica Cliffe. Together, they had three children: Brian, Melanie and Jack.  After they divorced, he was in a domestic partnership with Beryl Hunter for 30 years until her death in 2005.

In January 1971 English footballer Bobby Moore was embroiled in what became a national media story when he and three other West Ham United players, Jimmy Greaves, Clyde Best and Brian Dear, spent the evening at London's 007 nightclub in Blackpool, the night before an important FA Cup match against Blackpool which they went on to lose 4–0, with then West Ham manager Ron Greenwood and the national media severely criticising the players. Moore later said of the incident, "I'd met Brian London on many occasions and thought it would be nice to look him up. I suppose we all realised at the time that we were leaving ourselves vulnerable".

Like many other boxers, London continued fighting long after his prime. He was 22 wins to 3 losses early in his career but lost 17 of his last 33 fights. In judging London's career it should be remembered that he fought some of the best fighters in the world, including four who at some stage were world champions – Ali, Patterson, Johansson and Pastrano.

The British Boxing website listed London at number eight in a list of the top ten post World War II British heavyweight boxers in 2004.

He had a dark sense of humour, and when asked if he would have done anything differently with Muhammad Ali, he replied, "Yeah, I should have shot him". He died on 23 June 2021 at the age of 87. He had suffered a long illness prior to his death.

Professional boxing record

|-
|align="center" colspan=8|37 Wins (26 knockouts, 11 decisions), 20 Losses (11 knockouts, 9 decisions), 1 Draw 
|-
| align="center" style="border-style: none none solid solid; background: #e3e3e3"|Result
| align="center" style="border-style: none none solid solid; background: #e3e3e3"|Record
| align="center" style="border-style: none none solid solid; background: #e3e3e3"|Opponent
| align="center" style="border-style: none none solid solid; background: #e3e3e3"|Type
| align="center" style="border-style: none none solid solid; background: #e3e3e3"|Round
| align="center" style="border-style: none none solid solid; background: #e3e3e3"|Date
| align="center" style="border-style: none none solid solid; background: #e3e3e3"|Location
| align="center" style="border-style: none none solid solid; background: #e3e3e3"|Notes
|-align=left
|Loss
|36–20–1
|align=left| Joe Bugner
|TKO
|5
|12 May 1970
|align=left| 
|align=left|
|-
|Loss
|36–19–1
|align=left| Jerry Quarry
|KO
|2
|3 Sep 1969
|align=left| 
|
|-
|Loss
|36–18–1
|align=left| Jim Fletcher
|TKO
|1
|10 April 1969
|align=left| 
|
|-
|Draw
|36–17–1
|align=left| Henry Clark
|PTS
|10
|6 Feb 1969
|align=left| 
|
|-
|Loss
|36–17
|align=left| Jack Bodell
|TKO
|9
|10 Jun 1968
|align=left| 
|
|-
|Loss
|36–16
|align=left| Roberto Davila
|TKO
|6
|29 Feb 1968
|align=left| 
|align=left|
|-
|Win
|37–15
|align=left| Zora Folley
|PTS
|10
|13 Nov 1967
|align=left| 
|
|-
|Win
|36–15
|align=left| James J. Woody
|PTS
|10
|15 Jun 1967
|align=left| 
|
|-
|Loss
|35–15
|align=left| Jerry Quarry
|
|10
|9 Mar 1967
|align=left| 
|
|-
|Loss
|35–14
|align=left| Muhammad Ali
|KO
|3
|6 August 1966
|align=left| 
|align=left|
|-
|Win
|35–13
|align=left| Amos Johnson
|
|7
|21 Jun 1966
|align=left| 
|align=left|
|-
|Loss
|34–13
|align=left| Thad Spencer
|PTS
|10
|2 May 1966
|align=left| 
|align=left|
|-
|Win
|34–12
|align=left| Roger Rischer
|KO
|1
|20 Sep 1965
|align=left| 
|
|-
|Win
|33–12
|align=left| Billy Walker
|PTS
|10
|30 Mar 1965
|align=left| 
|align=left|
|-
|Win
|32–12
|align=left| Giorgio Masteghin
|
|4
|2 Feb 1965
|align=left| 
|
|-
|Win
|31–12
|align=left| Chip Johnson
|TKO
|4
|15 Dec 1964
|align=left| 
|align=left|
|-
|Loss
|30–12
|align=left| Johnny Prescott
|PTS
|10
|13 Jun 1964
|align=left| 
|align=left|
|-
|Loss
|30–11
|align=left| Henry Cooper
|PTS
|15
|24 Feb 1964
|align=left| 
|align=left|
|-
|Win
|30–10
|align=left| Bill Nielsen
|KO
|4
|2 Dec 1963
|align=left| 
|align=left|
|-
|Win
|29–10
|align=left| Don Warner
|PTS
|8
|8 May 1963
|align=left| 
|align=left|
|-
|Loss
|28–10
|align=left| Ingemar Johansson
|PTS
|12
|21 April 1963
|align=left| 
|align=left|
|-
|Win
|28–9
|align=left| Tom McNeeley
|PTS
|10
|29 Jan 1963
|align=left| 
|align=left|
|-
|Win
|27–9
|align=left| Von Clay
|PTS
|10
|11 Oct 1962
|align=left| 
|align=left|
|-
|Win
|26–9
|align=left| Howard King
|KO
|6
|14 Jun 1962
|align=left| 
|
|-
|Loss
|25–9
|align=left| Santo Amonti
|PTS
|10
|7 Jul 1962
|align=left| 
|align=left|
|-
|Win
|25–8
|align=left| Young Jack Johnson
|PTS
|10
|26 Feb 1962
|align=left| 
|align=left|
|-
|Loss
|24–8
|align=left| Eddie Machen
|RTD
|5
|17 Oct 1961
|align=left| 
|align=left|
|-
|Win
|24–7
|align=left| William Herman Hunter
|TKO
|8
|24 April 1961
|align=left| 
|-
|Loss
|23–7
|align=left| Dick Richardson
|TKO
|8
|29 Jun 1960
|align=left| 
|align=left|
|-
|Win
|23–6
|align=left| Pete Rademacher
|KO
|7
|26 April 1960
|align=left| 
|
|-
|Loss
|22–6
|align=left| Nino Valdes
|TKO
|7
|1 Dec 1959
|align=left| 
|align=left|
|-
|Loss
|22–5
|align=left| Floyd Patterson
|KO
|11
|1 May 1959
|align=left| 
|align=left|
|-
|Loss
|22–4
|align=left| Henry Cooper
|PTS
|15
|12 Jan 1959
|align=left| 
|align=left|
|-
|Win
|22–3
|align=left| Willie Pastrano
|TKO
|5
|30 Sep 1958
|align=left| 
|align=left|
|-
|Win
|21–3
|align=left| Joe Erskine
|KO
|8
|3 Jun 1958
|align=left| 
|align=left|
|-
|Loss
|20–3
|align=left| Willie Pastrano
|PTS
|10
|25 Feb 1958
|align=left| 
|align=left|
|-
|Win
|20–2
|align=left| Howie Turner
|PTS
|10
|10 Dec 1957
|align=left| 
|align=left|
|-
|Win
|19–2
|align=left| Kitione Lave
|PTS
|10
|12 Jun 1957
|align=left| 
|
|-
|Win
|18–2
|align=left| Peter Bates
|KO
|2
|1 Jul 1957
|align=left| 
|
|-
|Win
|17–2
|align=left| Willy Schagen
|KO
|1
|27 May 1957
|align=left| 
|align=left|
|-
|Win
|16–2
|align=left| Robert Duquesne
|KO
|1
|5 Mar 1957
|align=left| 
|align=left|
|-
|Loss
|15–2
|align=left| Heinz Neuhaus
|PTS
|10
|3 Feb 1957
|align=left| 
|align=left|
|-
|Win
|15–1
|align=left| Werner Wiegand
|KO
|2
|19 Nov 1956
|align=left| 
|align=left|
|-
|Win
|14–1
|align=left| Trevor Snell
|KO
|2
|27 Jun 1956
|align=left| 
|align=left|
|-
|Win
|13–1
|align=left| George Naufahu
|TKO
|4
|9 Jul 1956
|align=left| 
|align=left|
|-
|Loss
|12–1
|align=left| Henry Cooper
|TKO
|1
|1 May 1956
|align=left| 
|align=left|
|-
|Win
|12–0
|align=left| Jose Peyre
|TKO
|1
|13 Mar 1956
|align=left| 
|
|-
|Win
|11–0
|align=left| Jim Cooper
|TKO
|4
|17 Jan 1956
|align=left| 
|align=left|
|-
|Win
|10–0
|align=left| Basil Kew
|TKO
|2
|6 Dec 1955
|align=left| 
|align=left|
|-
|Win
|9–0
|align=left| Prosper Beck
|KO
|1
|11 Nov 1955
|align=left| 
|align=left|
|-
|Win
|8–0
|align=left| Simon Templar
|TKO
|7
|24 Oct 1955
|align=left| 
|align=left|
|-
|Win
|7–0
|align=left| José González Sales
|TKO
|3
|7 Oct 1955
|align=left| 
|align=left|
|-
|Win
|6–0
|align=left| Robert Eugene
|
|8
|8 Jun 1955
|align=left| 
|align=left|
|-
|Win
|5–0
|align=left| Paddy Slavin
|TKO
|2
|11 Jul 1955
|align=left| 
|align=left|
|-
|Win
|4–0
|align=left| Dinny Powell
|KO
|4
|6 Jun 1955
|align=left| 
|align=left|
|-
|Win
|3–0
|align=left| Hugh McDonald
|KO
|2
|23 May 1955
|align=left| 
|align=left|
|-
|Win
|2–0
|align=left| Frank Walshaw
|
|2
|18 April 1955
|align=left| 
|align=left|
|-
|Win
|1–0
|align=left| Dennis Lockton
|
|1
|22 Mar 1955
|align=left| 
|align=left|
|}

See also
 List of British heavyweight boxing champions

References

Further reading
 Riddle, John (2008). Hartlepool People: A Tribute to the Town's Rich, Famous and Infamous, Cormorant Publishing Hartlepool,

External links

 

1934 births
2021 deaths
Boxers at the 1954 British Empire and Commonwealth Games
Commonwealth Games gold medallists for England
Commonwealth Games medallists in boxing
English male boxers
Heavyweight boxers
People from West Hartlepool
Sportspeople from Hartlepool
Sportspeople from Blackpool
Medallists at the 1954 British Empire and Commonwealth Games